Green Horse Rustlers is a 2016 Czech adventure drama film.

Plot
The film is about illegal digging of Moldavites. Kača starts to live by illegally digging Moldavites when he has to leave collective farm when it got bankrupt. He convinces his old friend Pavel to help him. Pavel is a geologist who recently got married. His wife Karolína isn't fond of Kača. Pavel quits his job at university when he sees how much he can earn by digging Moldavites. This gets him into conflict with his wife.

Cast
 Pavel Liška as Kača
 Marek Adamczyk as Pavel
 Jenovéfa Boková as Karolína
 Gabriela Míčová as Jarmila
 Šárka Vaculíková as Marcela
 Bolek Polívka as Senecký

Reception
The film has received mostly positive reviews from critics.

References

External links
 

2016 films
2010s adventure drama films
Czech adventure drama films
2010s Czech-language films
2016 drama films